Ashareh-ye Bozorg (also Romanized as ‘Ashāreh-ye Bozorg; also known as ‘Ashāreh) is a village in Elhayi Rural District, in the Central District of Ahvaz County, Khuzestan Province, Iran. At the 2006 census, its population was 353, in 58 families.

References 

Populated places in Ahvaz County